Maulana Md. Nurul Islam (Maulana Mohammad Nurul Islam) is a Bangladesh Awami League politician and the former Member of Parliament of Jamalpur-4. Mr. Islam is former state minister for Ministry of Religious Affairs (Bangladesh) during Awami League Government of 1996-2001.

Career
Islam was elected to parliament from Jamalpur-4 as a Bangladesh Awami League candidate in 1996.

References

Awami League politicians
Living people
6th Jatiya Sangsad members
Year of birth missing (living people)